"Somewhere in My Heart" is a song by Scottish band Aztec Camera. It was released as the third single from their third studio album, Love (1987). The song was produced by Michael Jonzun and written by Roddy Frame. Released as a single in 1988, the track peaked at number three on the UK Singles Chart and became a top-40 hit in Australia and Ireland. The music video was directed by John Scarlett-Davis and produced by Nick Verden for Radar Films.

Background 
Frame said in 2014 that the song has been "great" for him, but at the time of creating the album, the song was not "in keeping" with the rest of Love. Frame revealed in a radio interview with the "Soho Social" programme, presented by Dan Gray, that he considered "Somewhere In My Heart" an odd song and initially thought it would be best as a B-side.

Around this time, Frame had became somewhat of a recluse, living in a remote wooden shack in Hollywood, Marple Bridge, in the hills above Manchester, "going through periods of good and bad mental health," while continuing to write music, including the lyric "From Westwood to Hollywood" in the song.

Critical reaction 
In their album review of Love, In The 80s mentioned that, "It is anchored by the song Somewhere in My Heart, which, of course, is the ultimate pop song", while Allmusic stated that Love "belatedly took off after its second [sic] single, Somewhere in My Heart".

Track listings 
7-inch single
A. "Somewhere in My Heart"
B. "Everybody Is a Number One" (Boston '86 version)

12-inch single
A1. "Somewhere in My Heart" (remix)
B1. "Everybody Is a Number One" (Boston '86 version)
B2. "Down the Dip"
B3. "Jump"

Mini-CD single
 "Somewhere in My Heart" – 4:00
 "Walk Out to Winter" – 3:49
 "Still on Fire" – 3:43
 "Everybody Is a Number One" (Boston '86 version) – 3:16

Chart performance 
The song reached number three in the UK Singles Chart. It also reached number 34 on the Australian Singles Chart.

Weekly charts

Year-end charts

Certifications

Cover versions 
Scottish singer Todd Gordon included a ballad version of this song on his 2014 album Love dot com, featuring a flugelhorn solo by Guy Barker.

In popular culture 
The song is featured prominently in the 2019 film 47 Meters Down: Uncaged and the 2020 Netflix series I Am Not Okay With This.

References 

1988 singles
1987 songs
Aztec Camera songs
Sire Records singles
Songs written by Roddy Frame
Warner Music Group singles